The 2000 Tandridge District Council election took place on 4 May 2000 to elect members of Tandridge District Council in Surrey, England. The whole council was up for election, rather than the normal election by thirds, following boundary changes since the last election in 1999. There remained 42 seats on the council: six three-member wards, ten two-member wards and four one-member wards. The Conservative Party gained overall control of the council from no overall control.

Background
Before the election an alliance between the Liberal Democrats and the Labour Party ran the council, with the Conservatives needing to make four gains to win a majority.

Election result
The Conservatives gained a majority with the leader of the Labour group, Dick Moran, among those to be defeated at the election.

Ward results

References

2000
2000 English local elections
2000s in Surrey